Harrison Kennedy may refer to: 

 Harrison Kennedy (footballer)
 Harrison Kennedy (musician)